Meeteer House is a historic home located at Newark in New Castle County, Delaware. It was built between 1822 and 1828, and is a -story, five bay, double pile frame dwelling in a vernacular Federal style. It sits on a raised basement and has a gable roof with dormers.  Also on the property is a contributing 19th century frame carriage house. The house was built by a prominent paper milling family, the Meeteers.

It was added to the National Register of Historic Places in 1993.

References

Houses on the National Register of Historic Places in Delaware
Federal architecture in Delaware
Houses completed in 1828
Houses in Newark, Delaware
National Register of Historic Places in New Castle County, Delaware